Cartel de Santa is the debut album from Mexican hip hop group Cartel de Santa. It was released in 2003 by Sony BMG. The album is mixed up by various element sounds such as Funk, Rock and Heavy Metal.

Track listing 
 Intro
 Todas Mueren Por Mí
 Asesinos de Asesinos - contains sample from "1, 2 Pass It" by D&D AllStars
 Cannabis
 Jake Mate (ft. Sick Jacken)
 Rima 1
 Burreros
 Perros
 Quinto Elemento
 Rima 2
 NTN
 La Pelotona
 Rima 3
 Super MC's (ft. Real Academia de La Rima)
 En Mi Ciudad
 Para Aquí o Para Llevar
 Chinga Los Racistas (ft. Tavo Limongi)
 Rima 4
 Factor Miedo
 Intenta Rimar (instrumental)

References

2003 debut albums
Cartel de Santa albums
Rap metal albums
Rap rock albums by Mexican artists
Sony BMG albums